Ruth Miriam Ross (née Guscott; 1 January 1920 – 30 August 1982) was a New Zealand historian. She was part of the 1970s movement that sought to revise academic understandings of the Treaty of Waitangi and educate the public on its translations and significance.

Biography 
Ross was born in Whanganui, New Zealand, in 1920. She was educated at Clifton House and Wanganui Girls' College where she was head prefect. At Victoria University College, she studied European and colonial history along with English literature. New Zealand history was not taught at universities at this time but through her teachers, Frederick Wood and J. C. Beaglehole, her interest in the subject was sparked.

In 1942, she started work as a research assistant at the Centennial branch of the Department of Internal Affairs. As staff left for war service she was given the project of creating a centennial atlas of New Zealand. She studied pre-1840 trade and settlement maps, furthering her interest in New Zealand history. Alongside her mapping work she wrote New Zealand's First Capital. Using old land claim files and the Native Land Court minute books she brought to light rich archives that had been disregarded and left in the General Assembly library attic.

To add to her historical resources Ross went on a research mission to Auckland, the Bay of Islands, and Hokianga, networking with local historians and building up contacts through which she established a core of scholarly material that would provide the foundations of her research for the next forty years.

In 1943, Ross married her first husband, Rex Whittington Burnard, a solicitor who died the following year.

On 21 December 1945, she married her second husband, Ian Munson Ross, in Wellington. Ross resigned before the birth of their first child and following the birth of their second they moved to Takapuna.

While her husband worked as a teacher, Ross wrote a primary school bulletin, Te Tiriti o Waitangi, which was published in 1958. This was written as a dialogue between different characters to teach school children the range of interpretations of the treaty and the conflicting meaning found within them.

References

1920 births
1982 deaths
People from Whanganui
20th-century New Zealand historians
New Zealand cartographers
People educated at Whanganui Girls' College
Victoria University of Wellington alumni
20th-century New Zealand public servants
20th-century cartographers